The 2010 Indian Super Cup was the 9th Indian Super Cup, an annual football match contested by the winners of the previous season's I-League and Federation Cup competitions. The match was between Dempo and East Bengal with Dempo winning 3-1. The match was played in Gurgaon, In 2010. The Man of the Match was Bryan Cohen of Dempo.

References

Indian Super Cup Finals
2010–11 in Indian football
East Bengal Club matches
Dempo SC matches